The Oregon State Hospital Historic District is a National Historic District in Salem, Oregon, United States. It was added to the National Register of Historic Places on February 28, 2008, and encompasses many of the buildings of the present-day Oregon State Hospital. The district is roughly bounded by D Street, Park Avenue, 24th Street and Bates Drive and includes the main hospital building as well as the headquarters of the Oregon Department of Corrections, known as the Dome Building, across the street.

The hospital was cited as an example of Kirkbride Plan mental hospital design. More than 60 historic buildings and structures are sited on  campus and are considered excellent examples of institutional buildings designed by Oregon architects, including Pietro Belluschi, William C. Knighton, Edgar M. Lazarus (the designer of Crown Point Vista House), and Walter D. Pugh.

See also
 List of Oregon's Most Endangered Places

References 

National Register of Historic Places in Salem, Oregon
Historic districts on the National Register of Historic Places in Oregon
2008 establishments in Oregon
Oregon's Most Endangered Places